The Fischbach Gallery is an art gallery in New York City. It was founded by Marilyn Cole Fischbach in 1960 at 799 Madison Avenue.  The gallery in its early days became known for hosting the first significant solo exhibitions of now leading art world figures including Eva Hesse, Alex Katz and Gary Kuehn.

In 1966 the Fishbach Gallery opened the groundbreaking exhibition Eccentric Abstraction curated by Lucy Lippard which is considered the first Postminimal, art exhibition. The exhibition included Alice Adams, Louis Bourgeois, Gary Kuehn, Eva Hesse, Bruce Nauman, Don Potts, Keith Sonnier and Frank Lincoln Viner.

The Fischbach Gallery would later move to two consecutive locations on 57th Street. In the 1970s Marilyn Fischbach hired Aladar Marberger as gallery director. Marberger shifted the gallery's emphasis from Avant-Garde Art to Realism. The gallery included artists Leigh Behnke, Alice Dalton Brown, Lois Dodd, Jane Freilicher, Ian Hornak, Knox Martin, John Moore, and Neil Welliver.

In the early 1980s, Marilyn Fischbach decided to take on three additional investors in the gallery, although she remained a partial owner until her death in 2003. One of the investors, Beverly Zagor, became an active partner until her death in May 2011. Another investor and active partner, Lawrence L. DiCarlo, is gallery director.

The Fischbach Gallery remains open and has relocated to 210 Eleventh Avenue in New York. It focuses primarily on contemporary realism.

References

External links
 Fischbach Gallery Website

1960 establishments in New York City
Realism (art movement)
Art museums and galleries in Manhattan
Art galleries established in 1960
Eleventh Avenue (Manhattan)